The 1888–89 United States Senate elections were held on various dates in various states, coinciding with Benjamin Harrison's victory over incumbent President Grover Cleveland. As these U.S. Senate elections were prior to the ratification of the Seventeenth Amendment in 1913, senators were chosen by state legislatures. Senators were elected over a wide range of time throughout 1888 and 1889, and a seat may have been filled months late or remained vacant due to legislative deadlock. In these elections, terms were up for the senators in Class 2.

Both parties were unchanged in the regular elections, but later special elections would give Republicans an eight-seat majority, mostly from newly admitted states.

Results summary 
Senate party division, 51st Congress (1889–1891)

 Majority party: Republican (39 to 51)
 Minority party: Democratic (37 to 35)
 Other parties: (0)
 Total seats: 76 to 88

Change in Senate composition

Before the elections

After the elections

Beginning of the next Congress

End of 1889

Race summaries

Special elections during the 50th Congress 
There were no special elections during 1888 or in 1889 before March 4.

Races leading to the 51st Congress 

In these regular elections, the winners were elected for the term beginning March 4, 1889; ordered by state.

All of the elections involved the Class 2 seats.

Elections during the 51st Congress 
In these elections, the winners were elected in 1889 after March 4; ordered by election date.

See also 
 1888 United States elections
 1888 United States presidential election
 1888 United States House of Representatives elections
 50th United States Congress
 51st United States Congress

References 

 Party Division in the Senate, 1789-Present, via Senate.gov